Martin Werhand (born May 13, 1968, in Neuwied, Rhineland-Palatinate) is a German publisher, editor and writer.
1997 he founded the publishing house Martin Werhand Verlag in Melsbach with focus on Fiction.

Life and work 
Martin Peter Werhand was born in 1968 as son of artisan blacksmith Klaus Rudolf Werhand. Whilst still studying, Werhand decided in 1997 to establish an independent literature publishing company. As publisher and editor he took care of the works of numerous young authors in the anthology series Junge Lyrik between 1999 and 2002. Starting with the first book of the series followed by Junge Lyrik II and Junge Lyrik III, numerous readings took place in Rhineland-Palatinate and North Rhine-Westphalia. 2006 he published the poetry anthology Die Jahreszeiten der Liebe. Since 2014 Werhand publishes apart from the anthologies also several series of poetry books.

In 2016 the Martin Werhand Verlag presented some new book series at Frankfurt Book Fair like  or 50 Gedichte.

Martin Werhand lives and works in Melsbach, Rhineland-Palatinate.

Poetry projects (selection) 
Since 1999 Martin Werhand realised as a publisher, editor and author together with institutions, bookshops and other publishers numerous poetry projects, for example on World Book Day on April 23, 2003, in Münster together with the Thalia Holding, where he presented himself as editor of the book and also as author together with six other poets, among them Florian Cieslik, Patric Hemgesberg and Thomas Bruns. Also in 2006, as the Bremer Straßenbahn AG under the direction of Dr. Joachim Tuz, he organized the project Poesie Bewegt (Poetry Moves) with many authors of Martin Werhand Verlag. Martin Werhand also contributed as an author

Publications (selection)

Books as editor

See also

Literature (selection) 
 Publishers' International ISBN Directory: 26th Edition of Publishers' International Directory with ISBN Index and the 20th Edition of the International ISBN Publishers' Directory. Geographical section: R-Z, Band 2, International ISBN Agency K. G. Saur Verlag, 1999, p. 654
 La construcción del "yo" femenino en la literatura, Biruté Ciplijauskaité, Universidad de Cádiz, Servicio de Publicaciones, 2004 – p. 437
 Not So Plain as Black and White: Afro-German Culture and History, 1890–2000, Patricia M. Mazón, Reinhild Steingröver (Editor), Boydell & Brewer, Patricia M. Mazón, Reinhild Steingröver – 2005 p. 231
 Stephan Koranyi (Editor): Gedichte zur Weihnacht, Reclam Verlag, 2009, p. 235, 241, 245
 Ina Nefzer (Editor): Gedichte wie Schmetterlinge, Thienemann Verlag, 2010, p. 124-127
 Wie viel Tod verträgt das Team?: Belastungs- und Schutzfaktoren in Hospizarbeit und Palliativmedizin, David Pfister, Monika Müller (Editors), Vandenhoeck & Ruprecht, 2014, p. 59
 Dietrich Bode (Editor): Italien. Eine Reise in Gedichten, Reclam Verlag, 2016, p. 125
 Annette Riedel, Anne-Christin Linde (Editors): Ethische Reflexion in der Pflege: Konzepte – Werte – Phänomene. Axel Springer SE, 2018, p. 134.
 Nicolai Riedel: Bibliographisches Handbuch der deutschsprachigen Lyrik 1945–2020. Metzler, 2023, p. 976

External links 

 Official website of Martin Werhand 
 
 Portrait of Martin Werhand in: Rheinland-Pfälzische Personendatenbank 
 Appearance at Frankfurt Book Fair October 2016 
 Martin Werhand in: WorldCat
 Martin Werhand In: Deutsches Literatur-Lexikon. Das 20. Jahrhundert - Nachtragsband: N - Z Volume 3, Verlag Walter de Gruyter, 2022, ISBN 978-3-11-072691-6

References 

1968 births
Living people
German publishers (people)
German editors
German male poets
German poets
Literary editors
People from Neuwied
People from the Rhine Province
Businesspeople from Rhineland-Palatinate
University of Cologne alumni